Lundu may refer to:

 Lundu, Sarawak, a town in Sarawak, Malaysia
 Lundu (dance), a Brazilian dance which originated from Angola
 Lundu language